Roman academies refers to associations of learned individuals and not institutes for instruction.

Such Roman Academies were always connected to larger educational structures conceived during and following the Italian Renaissance, at the height of which (from the close of the Western Schism in 1418 to the middle of the 16th century) there were two main intellectual centers, Florence and Rome. Scientific, literary, and artistic culture attained there a development as intense as it was multiform, and the earlier Roman and Florentine academies were typical examples of this variety.

History

Middle Ages
The Middle Ages did not bequeath to Rome any institutions that could be called scientific or literary academies. As a rule, there was little inclination towards such institutions. The Academy of Charlemagne and the Floral Academy at Toulouse were princely courts at which literary meetings were held. Literature did not get a stronger footing at Rome in part because of the constant politico-religious disturbances of the Middle Ages. Owing to the oppression of the papacy under the Hohenstaufen emperors, the struggles for ecclesiastical liberty begun by Gregory VII, the epic conflict between Guelph and Ghibelline, and the arrival of French domination which gave birth to papal Avignon and the Western Schism, medieval Rome was certainly no place for learned academies.

The Renaissance

Bessarion's circle
In Rome, as in Florence, Renaissance academies aimed to reproduce the traditions of the Academy of Plato, promoting the cultivation of philosophy in the Ancient Greek sense of "love of wisdom", especially characterized by Renaissance Platonism and its neoplatonic ideas. One of several meeting places for scholarly events and discussion was the house of the Cardinal and Byzantine Greek exile  Basilios Bessarion, which itself has come to be referred to as an academia (academy). His extensive library (which he bequeathed to the city of Venice) was at the disposal of his many house guests for study of new humanistic learning. His visitors included learned Greek refugees, whom he supported by commissioning transcripts of Greek manuscripts and translations into Latin to help make a corpus of Greek scholarship available to Western Europeans.

Pomponio's Accademia Romana
A further circle of humanists has become known as the "Roman Academy" (Accademia Romana) of Pomponio. A thrifty humanist scholar who refused the customary patronage of rich cardinals, Pomponio Leto  hosted a circle of friends who shared in the pagan-influenced humanism which was becoming characteristic of the Renaissance in Rome and elsewhere. Born in Calabria in 1425 as Giulio Sanseverino, the natural son of a nobleman of the Sanseverino family, in Rome Pomponio devoted his energies to the enthusiastic study of classical antiquity  and became the centre of a group of like-minded friends, each of whom assumed a classical name (his was Julius Pomponius Laetus, or Laetus for short). Prominent members were humanists with neo-pagan interests and an epicurean stance, such as Bartolomeo Platina and Filippo Buonaccorsi. At a time when Rome was rife with political intrigue fomented by the Roman barons and the neighbouring princes, Paul II (1464–71) arrested Pomponio and the leaders of the Academy on charges of irreligion, immorality, and an alleged conspiracy against the pope. The prisoners were tortured and eventually released. The Academy, however, dissolved.

16th-century 'academies'
The 16th century saw at Rome a great increase of literary and aesthetic circles or 'academies', more or less inspired by the Renaissance, all of which assumed, as was the fashion, odd and fantastic names. We learn from various sources the names of many such institutes; as a rule, they soon perished and left no trace. At the beginning of the 16th century came the "Accademia degli Intronati", for the encouragement of theatrical representations. There were also the Academy of the "Vignaiuoli", or "Vinegrowers" (1530), and the Academy "della Virtù" (1538), founded by Claudio Tolomei under the patronage of Cardinal Ippolito de' Medici. These were followed by a new Academy in the "Orti" or Farnese gardens. There were also the Academies of the "Intrepidi" (1560), the "Animosi" (1576), and the "Illuminati (Roman)" (1598); this last, founded by the Marchesa Isabella Aldobrandini Pallavicino. Towards the middle of the 16th century there were also the Academy of the "Notti Vaticane" (Vatican Nights), founded by St. Charles Borromeo; an "Accademia di Diritto civile e canonico", and another of the university scholars and students of philosophy (Accademia Eustachiana). In the 17th century we meet with similar academies; the "Umoristi" (1611), the "Fantastici (1625), and the "Ordinati", founded by Cardinal Dati and Giulio Strozzi. About 1700 were founded the academies of the "Infecondi", the "Occulti", the "Deboli", the "Aborigini", the "Immobili", the "Accademia Esquilina", and others. As a rule these academies, all very much alike, were merely circles of friends or clients gathered around a learned man or wealthy patron, and were dedicated to literary pastimes rather than methodical study. They fitted in, nevertheless, with the historical milieu and in their own way played significant roles in historical development. Despite their empirical and fugitive character, they helped to cultivate a general esteem for literary and other studies. Cardinals, prelates, and the clergy in general were most favourable to this movement, and assisted it by patronage and collaboration.

17th century
With the advent of the 17th century, while the Roman Academy in its older form still survived, there began a new epoch. The new style of academy was constituted as a public body, no longer confined to a small circle of friends. It set itself a fixed and permanent scope in the field of science, letters, and arts, often of a polemic or apologetic character. Naturally this form of the new or remodelled Roman academies was closely allied with the general academic movement of Italy and of foreign countries, whose typical instance was the French Academy founded by Richelieu. It was at this point that academies became practical and efficacious instruments of culture, with a direct influence on public opinion; in this way, too, they claimed the special attention of the heads of the state. This was especially the case at Rome, where the papacy kept up its traditional patronage of the most varied ecclesiastical and general scholarship. In this period the first Roman academies that call for mention are the "Accademia dei Lincei" (Lynxes), founded in 1603, and the "Arcadia", founded in 1656. Ecclesiastical academies, whose scope was fixed by the Counter-Reformation, were the "Accademia Liturgica", founded by Benedict XIV, and the "Accademia Theologica", founded in 1695. All of these are still extant; we shall treat of them in detail in due course. After the French Revolution and the restoration to Rome of the papal government, the new conditions suggested the adoption of the "Academy" as a link between the old and the new, and as a means of invigorating ecclesiastical culture and of promoting the defence of the Church. In this way there sprang up new academies, while old ones were revived. Under Pius VII (1800–23) were founded the "Accademia di Religione Cattolica", and the "Accademia Tiberina"; in 1835 that of the "Immacolata Concezione". The "Accademia Liturgica" was reestablished in 1840, and in 1847 the "Accademia dei (Nuovi) Lincei". Apart from this group we have to chronicle the appearance in 1821 of the "Accademia Filarmonica". After the Italian occupation of Rome (1870), new Catholic academies were founded to encourage learning and apologetics; such were the "Accademia di Conferenze Storico-Giuridiche" and the "Accademia di San Tommaso", founded by Leo XIII, to which must be added, though not called an Academy, the "Società di Conferenze di Archeologia Sacra", founded in 1875. In 1870 the Italian government resuscitated, or better, founded anew, the "Accademia dei Lincei", and in 1875 the "Accademia Medica".

The Academies

Accademia dei Lincei and dei Nuovi Lincei (1603)

The Academia dei Lincei is the academy of the Sciences of Rome. It has a long history and numerous prestigious members, including and from the time of Galileo.

Pontificia Accademia degli Arcadi (1690)

This literary academy was founded in 1690 by Giovanni Mario Crescimbeni and Gian Vincenzo Gravina, in memory of Queen Christina of Sweden, who had abdicated the Swedish crown in 1654 and converted to Catholicism, moving to Rome where she spent much of the rest of her life and became renowned as patron of arts and music. After her death in 1689, the Academy of Arcadia was established in her memory, electing the late Queen Christina of Sweden as its symbolical head ("Basilissa"). The Academy would last for the next two hundred years, becoming a leading cultural institution right up to the 20th century.

The Academy of Arcadia was so called because its chief aim and intention were to imitate in literature the simplicity of the ancient shepherds, who were fabulously supposed to have lived in Arcadia in the golden age, divinely inspired in poetry  by the Muses, Apollo, Hermes and Pan. The Arcadians proposed to return to the fields of truth, always singing of subjects of pastoral simplicity, drawing their inspiration from Greco-Roman bucolic poetry.

Common to member poets was the desire to oppose Marinists, and return to classicism and rationalism, influenced by the philosophy of Cartesius. Norms and rituals of the Academy took their cues from classic and pastoral mythology: it was the custom of the academics to assume pastoral names.

The most noteworthy member of the academy was Antonio Pietro Metastasio.

Pontificia Accademia Teologica
Like its sister societies at Rome, this academy was of private origin. In 1695, a number of friends gathered in the house of the priest, Raffaele Cosma Girolami, for lectures and discussions on theological matters. These meetings soon took on the character of an academy. In 1707 it was united to the Accademia Ecclesiastica. Clement XII gave it formal recognition in 1718 and assigned it a hall in the Sapienza (University of Rome), thereby making it a source of encouragement for young students of theology. The academy disposed of a fund of eighteen thousand scudi ($18,000), the income of which was devoted to prizes for the most proficient students of theology. Among the patrons were several cardinals, and the professors in the theological faculty in the University acted as censors. The successors of Clement XII continued to encourage the academy. In 1720 Clement XIII ordered that among its members twenty indigent secular priests should receive for six years from the papal treasury an annual allowance of fifty scudi and, other things being equal, should have the preference in competitive examinations. It is on these lines, substantially, that its work is carried on at present. The Academy is located at the Pontifical Major Roman Seminary.

Pontificia Accademia Liturgica
This academy was the product of the notable 18th century movement in liturgical studies which owed so much to the great theologian and liturgist, Benedict XIV (1745-8). Disbanded in the time of the Revolution, the Academy was reorganized by the Lazarists, under Gregory XV (1840), and received a cardinal-protector. It continues its work under the direction of the Lazarists, and holds frequent conferences in which liturgical and cognate subjects are treated from the historical and the practical point of view. It is located in the Lazarist house, and its proceedings are, since 1886, published in the Lazarist monthly known as "Ephemerides Liturgicae" (Liturgical Diary).

Pontificia Accademia di Religione Cattolica
This academy arose from an urgent need to organize Catholic apologetics in response to the anti-Christian polemics of the "Encyclopédie", coupled with events surrounding the Revolution. The Roman priest Giovanni Fortunato Zamboni founded it in 1801, with the avowed aim of defending the dogmatic and moral teaching of the Church. It was formally recognized by Pius VII, and succeeding popes have continued to give it their support. It holds monthly meetings for the discussion of various points in dogmatic and moral theology, in philosophy, history, etc. Its conferences are generally published in periodicals, and a special edition is printed for the Academy. A number of these dissertations have been printed, and form a collection of several volumes entitled "Dissertazioni lette nella Pontificia Accademia Romana di Religione Cattolica". The Academy has as honorary censors a number of cardinals. The president of the Academy is also a cardinal. It includes promoters, censors, resident members, and corresponding members. It awards an annual prize for the members most assiduous at the meetings, and is located in the palace of the Cancelleria Apostolica.

Pontificia Accademia Tiberina
In 1809 the well-known archaeologist, Antonio Nibby founded the short-lived "Accademia Ellenica". In 1813 many of its members withdrew to found the "Accademia Tiberina". One of the members, A. Coppi, drew up its first rules, according to which the Academy was to devote itself to the study of Latin and Italian literature, hold a weekly meeting, and a public session monthly. Great scientific or literary events were to be recognised by extraordinary meetings. It was also agreed that the Academy should undertake the history of Rome from Odoacer to Clement XIV, as well as the literary history from the time of that pontiff. The historiographer of the Academy was to edit its history and to collect the biographies of famous men, Romans or residents in Rome, who had died since the foundation of the "Tiberina". For this latter purpose there was established a special "Necrologio Tiberiano". The Academy began in 1816 the annual coinage of commemorative medals. When Leo XII ordered (1825) that all the scientific associations in Rome should be approved by the Sacred Congregation of Studies, the "Tiberina received official recognition; its field was enlarged, so as to include research in art, commerce, and especially in agriculture. Pius VII had done much for the promotion of agriculture in the States of the Church, and Leo XII was desirous of continuing the good work of his predecessor. Under Gregory XVI, in 1831, a year of grave disorders and political plottings, the Academy was closed, but it was soon reopened by the same pontiff, who desired the "Tiberina" to devote itself to general culture, science, and letters, Roman history and archaeology, and to agriculture. The meetings were to be monthly, and it was to print annual reports, or Rendiconti. The Academy was able to establish important relations with foreign scientists, and constituted with 2,000 members, resident, corresponding, and honorary. The "Tiberina" is at present inactive; its proceedings are no longer printed. Its last protector was Cardinal Parocchi. Like several other Roman Academies, it is located in the Palace of the Cancelleria Apostolica.

Pontificia Accademia Romana di Archeologia

The Pontifical Academy of Archaeology (or Pontificia Accademia Romana di Archeologia) is 
an academic honorary society established in Rome by the Catholic Church for the advancement of Christian archaeological study.

Accademia Filarmonica
The Accademia Filarmonica Romana was founded in 1821 for the study and practice of music. It has 200 members, and is located at 225, Piazza San Marcello.

Pontificia Accademia della Immacolata Concezione
This academy was founded in 1835 by young students from the Roman Seminary in the Palazzo di Sant'Apollinare and of the Gregorian University. Among its founders Monsignor Vincenzo Anivitti deserves special mention. Its purpose was the encouragement of serious study among the youth of Rome. Hence, two-thirds of the members must be young students. Its title was assumed at a later date. It was approved in 1847 by the Sacred Congregation of Studies. The work of the Academy is divided into five sections: theology; philology and history; philosophy; physics, ethics and economics. Its meetings are held weekly, and in 1873 it began to publish bimonthly reports of its proceedings under the title "Memorie per gli Atti della Pont. Accademia della Immacolata Concezione". Twenty-one numbers were issued. Since 1875 the Academy has published many of the lectures read before its members. Its most flourishing period was from 1873 to 1882. Among its most illustrious deceased members may be mentioned Father Secchi SJ, Monsignor Balan, and Michele Stefano de Rossi. The Academy, now in decline, is attached to the Church of the Santi Apostoli.

Regia Accademia Medica
It was founded in 1875 for the study of medical and cognate sciences, has fifty ordinary members, and is located in the University.

Pontificia Accademia di Conferenze Storico-Giuridiche
This academy was founded in 1878 to encourage among Catholics the study of history, archaeology, and jurisprudence. In 1880 it began to publish a quarterly entitled "Studi e Documenti di Storia e di Diritto", highly esteemed for its learned articles and for its publication of important documents with apposite commentaries. After an existence of twenty-five years this review ceased to appear at the end of 1905. The president of the Academy is a cardinal, and it holds its meetings in the Roman Seminary.

Pontificia Accademia Romana di San Tommaso di Aquino
When Leo XIII at the beginning of his pontificate undertook the restoration of scholastic philosophy and theology, this academy was founded (1880) for the diffusion of Thomistic doctrine. Its president is a cardinal, and its meetings are held in the Roman Seminary.

Academic Schools of Rome
The following is a brief account of the several academic schools mentioned above. One is ecclesiastical, the others are devoted to the fine arts. Some are Roman, and others are foreign:

Pontificia Accademia dei Nobili Ecclesiastici

It was founded in 1701 by Clement XI, to prepare for the diplomatic service of the Holy See a body of men trained in the juridical sciences and in other requisite branches of learning. At the time, European diplomacy was usually confided to the nobility; hence the Academy was instituted and maintained for noble ecclesiastics. However, later, it opened its doors more freely to the sons of families in some way distinguished and in comfortable circumstances. Occasionally this academy languished, especially in the first half of the 19th century, but since then it has recovered and has steadily improved. Of late it has become a school of higher ecclesiastical education, traditionally but not exclusively with an eye to a diplomatic career for its students. The academic course includes ecclesiastical diplomacy, political economy, diplomatic forms (stile diplomatico), the principal foreign languages, and, in addition, internships at the bureaux of various congregations for such students as wish to prepare themselves for an office in any of these bodies. As a rule, Romans are not admitted to this academy, it having been expressly designed for those who, not being Romans, would have no other opportunity to acquire such specific education and training. Its students pay a monthly fee. It has a cardinal-protector and a Roman prelate for president (rector). It owns and occupies its own palace (70, Piazza della Minerva).

Regia Accademia Romana di San Luca
Among the Roman Academies dedicated to the fine arts is the Regia Accademia Romana di San Luca (Accademia delle Belle Arti). This academy exhibits the evolution of the Roman corporation of artist-painters, reformed under Sixtus V (1577) by Federigo Zuccari and Girolamo Muziano. It took then the title of academy, and had for its purpose the teaching of the fine arts, the reward of artistic merit, and the preservation and illustration of the historic and artistic monuments of Rome. In respect of all these it enjoyed papal approval and encouragement. It rendered great services and counted among its members illustrious masters and pupils. In 1870 it passed under the control of the new government, and is now under the patronage of the King. It possesses a gallery of paintings and an excellent library, open to the public (44, Via Bonella).

Accademia Nazionale di Santa Cecilia

The Accademia Nazionale di Santa Cecilia or Accademia di Musica derives from a school of music founded in 1570 by Giovanni Pierluigi da Palestrina and  Nanini that was in 1583 canonically designated by Gregory XIII as a confraternity, or congregation. The popes encouraged this organisation as an ideal instrument for the dissemination of good taste and the promotion of musical science. Urban VIII decreed that no musical works should be published without the permission of the censors of this congregation, and that no school of music or of singing should be opened in any church without the written permission of its deputies. This very rigorous ordinance provoked numerous complaints from interested parties, and its restrictions were soon more honoured in the breach than the observance. In 1684 Innocent XI allowed to the congregation the right to admit foreign members, and in 1774 women were admitted as members. Owing to the political troubles of the period, the congregation was suspended from 1799 to 1803, and again from 1809 to 1822. Among its members have been illustrious musicians. We may mention, besides the above-named founders, Carissimi; Frescobaldi, the organist; Giuseppe Tartini, violinist and author of a new system of harmony; and Muzio Clementi, pianist. From 1868 Giovanni Sgambati and Ettore Finelli taught without payment in this academy. Since 1870 the congregation of Santa Cecilia has been transformed into a Royal Academy. In 1876 the "Liceo di Musica" was added to it, with a substantial appropriation from the funds of the province and city of Rome. In 1874 the statutes of this school were remodelled. It is greatly esteemed and is much frequented (18, Via dei Greci).

Accademia di Raffaele Sanzio
This is a school of modern foundation, with daily and evening courses for the study of art (504, Corso Umberto I).

There are several foreign academies of a scholastic kind. The American Academy, founded in 1896, is located in the Villa del' Aurora (42, Via Lombardi). The Académie de France was founded by Louis XIV in 1666. This illustrious school has given many great artists to France. Its competitive prize (Prix de Rome) is very celebrated. It owns and occupies its own palace, the Villa Medici on the Pincio. The English Academy was founded in 1821, and possesses a notable library (53, B Via Margutta). The Accademia di Spagna was founded in 1881 (32, B Piazza San Pietro in Montorio). Finally, as formerly, there are now in Rome various associations which are true academies and may be classed as such, though they do not bear that name.

Societá di Conferenze di Sacra Archeologia
The Societá di Conferenze di Sacra Archeologia was founded in 1875 by Giambattista De Rossi, and is dedicated to archaeology. Its name is well merited, expressing as it does the active contributions of its members. At each conference are announced or illustrated new discoveries and important studies are presented. The meetings are held monthly from November to March and are open to the public. This excellent association has done much to popularize the study of Christian archaeology, especially the study of the Roman catacombs. Its proceedings are published annually in the "Nuovo Bulletino di Sacra Archeologia”, and its sessions are held in the palace of the Cancelleria Apostolica.

The British and American Archaeological Society
The British and American Archeological Society was founded in 1865 by John Henry Parker.

Circolo Giuridico di Roma
It was founded in 1899. Attached to it is the "Istituto di Diritto Romano" founded in 1887 for the promotion of the study of Roman law (307, Corso Umberto I).

References

Sources

External links
 Database of Italian academies from the British Library
 The Italian academies 1525–1700 (a project)

Scientific organisations based in Italy
History of Rome
History of Florence
Education in Rome
Education in Florence
Italian Renaissance